Galbulimima is a genus of flowering plants and the sole genus of the family Himantandraceae. Members of the family are found in the tropical zones of eastern Malaysia, the Moluccas, the Celebes, New Guinea, northern Australia and the Solomon Islands.

Being classified in the magnoliids, this family is part of neither the monocots nor the eudicots and is related to families such as the Annonaceae, the Degeneriaceae, the Eupomatiaceae and the Magnoliaceae.

The genus comprises from 1 to 3 species, according to different authorities, including Galbulimima belgraveana.

References

Magnoliales
Magnoliales genera